Cheshmeh Sorkh or Cheshmeh-ye Sorkh may refer to:
 Cheshmeh Sorkh, Ilam
 Cheshmeh Sorkh, Kermanshah
 Cheshmeh Sorkh-e Qabr-e Baba, Kermanshah Province
 Cheshmeh Sorkh, Lorestan